Paavo Rintala (born in Viipuri, Finland on 20 September 1930 – died in Kirkkonummi, Finland 8 August 1999) was a Finnish novelist and theologian. He also wrote theatre pieces, radio plays and prose.

Rintala has won the Kirjallisuuden valtionpalkinto Finnish literature prize many times, including in 1956, 1963, 1966, 1972, 1972 and 1991. He won the Finlandia Prize as a Finnish laureate for his 1991 novel Sarmatian Orfeus. He also won the Runeberg Prize (in Finnish Runeberg-palkinto) in 1994. Two of his novels have been adapted to film by Finnish film director Mikko Niskanen. First was the 1958 novel Pojat adapted in 1962 with same title (English title The Boys). The other was the 1963 novel Sissiluutnantti adapted to film as Sissit.

He is buried in the Hietaniemi Cemetery in Helsinki.

Bibliography
Novels
1954: Kuolleiden evankeliumi
1955: Rikas ja köyhä
1956: Lakko
1958: Pojat (adapted to film by Mikko Niskanen in same titled film)
1959: Pikkuvirkamiehen kuolema
1959: Jumala on kauneus
1960: Mummoni ja Mannerheim
1961: Mummoni ja marsalkka
1962: Mummon ja marskin tarinat
1963: Sissiluutnantti (adapted to film by Mikko Niskanen as Sissit)
1965: Keskusteluja lasten kanssa
1965: Sukeltaja
1966: Sotilaiden äänet
1967: Sodan ja rauhan äänet
1968: Leningradin kohtalosinfonia (also a radio play)
1969: Paasikiven aika
1970: Kekkosen aika
1970: Valitut teokset
1972: Viapori 1906
1972: Paavalin matkat
1974: Romeo ja Julia häränvuonna
1976: Nahkapeitturien linjalla I
1979: Nahkapeitturien linjalla II
1982: Puolan malja
1982: Valehtelijan muistelmat
1984: Eläinten rauhanliike
1985: Vänrikin muistot
1987: St. Petersburgin salakuljetus
1990: Minä, Grünewald
1991: Sarmatian Orfeus (nominated for Finlandia prize)
1993: Aika ja uni (nominated for Finlandia prize)
1994: Marian rakkaus (nominated for Finlandia prize)
1996: Faustus

Children books
1972: Uu ja poikanen

Short stories
1963: Eino (collection of 7 short stories

Prose
1964: Palvelijat hevosten selässä
1969: Napapiirin äänet
1982: Velkani Karjalalle

Radio plays
1968: Leningradin kohtalosinfonia (based on same-titled novel)

Reports
1970: Vietnamin kurjet
1983: Maatyömies ja kuu
1984: Porvari Punaisella torilla
1986: Carossa ja Anna

Summaries
1974: Kesäkuu 44

Theatre
1981: Dostojevskin galleriat
1993: Aika ja uni (opera libretto)

Footnotes

1930 births
1999 deaths
Writers from Vyborg
Burials at Hietaniemi Cemetery